Mental health service(s) may refer to:

Community mental health service
Psychiatric hospital
Psychiatric and mental health nursing

Government programs 
Child and Adolescent Mental Health Services (CAMHS), NHS-provided services in the United Kingdom
Substance Abuse and Mental Health Services Administration (SAMHSA), a branch of the U.S. Department of Health and Human Services

See also 
California Mental Health Services Act
Services for mental disorders